Bridle usually refers to headgear worn by horses and other animals that are ridden or driven.

Bridle may also refer to:

Items
 A part of a kite
 A line or strip of webbing connecting a pilot chute to the canopy of a parachute
 Scold's bridle, a 16th-century instrument of punishment or torture

People
 Adam Bridle, South African professional wrestler better known as Angélico
 Augustus Bridle (1868–1952), Canadian journalist and author
 Chris Bridle, president of Orthodontic Technicians Association
 James Bridle (born 1980), British visual artist and writer
 Kathleen Bridle (1897–1989), British artist and teacher
 Paul Augustus Bridle (1914–1988), Canadian diplomat
 Sarah Bridle, British professor of astronomy

See also
 Bridle path (disambiguation)
 
 Bridel (disambiguation)